Holsinger (in Germany mostly spelled Holzinger) is a German surname. Notable people with the surname include:

 David Holsinger (born 1945), an American composer and conductor
 Henry R. Holsinger (18331905), American pastor, publisher and leader of The Brethren Church
 James W. Holsinger, Jr. (born 1939), American physician and retired major general of the U.S. Army nominated to be Surgeon General of the United States
 Rufus W. Holsinger (18661930), American photographer

See also
 Holzinger (disambiguation)